The women's 5000 metres event at the 2006 Commonwealth Games was held on March 24.

Results

References
Results

5000
2006
2006 in women's athletics